Axel T. Brunger (born November 25, 1956) is a German American biophysicist. He is Professor of Molecular and Cellular Physiology at Stanford University, and a Howard Hughes Medical Institute Investigator. He served as the Chair of the Department of Molecular and Cellular Physiology (2013–2017).

Early life 
Brunger was born in Leipzig, Germany, on November 25, 1956. He graduated with a degree in Physics and Mathematics from the University of Hamburg in 1977. He completed his Diplom in Physics from the University of Hamburg in 1980. He completed his PhD in Biophysics from Technical University of Munich in 1982, advised by Klaus Schulten.

Academic career 
Brunger held a NATO postdoctoral fellowship to work with Martin Karplus at Harvard University, where he subsequently became a research associate in the Department of Chemistry after a brief return to Germany. He joined the Molecular Biophysics and Biochemistry department at Yale University in 1987 and moved to Stanford University in 2000. Brunger was elected to the United States National Academy of Sciences in 2005 and won the inaugural DeLano Award for Computational Biosciences in 2011.

Research 
Brunger is known for developing a computer program called CNS used for solving structures based on X-ray diffraction or solution NMR data, which was first released in 1992. The program is a major extension of a 1987 program developed with John Kuriyan and Karplus called X-PLOR, whose original inspiration was motivated by Marius Clore's efforts in interpreting NMR data and which has been extended by Clore's continued development of XPLOR-NIH.

These programs make use of a method called simulated annealing in conjunction with molecular dynamics to refine protein structures. X-PLOR was the first time a modern optimization technique was applied to the problem of crystallographic refinement. Brunger also subsequently introduced the RFree technique to cross-validate the model given the observed data. In the mid-1990s, his team extended X-PLOR into a complete system to solve structures, which then became the more full-featured tool CNS, capable of performing a series of steps necessary for crystallography structure determination, such as obtaining phases from experimental data and molecular replacement phasing from known homologous structures.

Brunger's research group currently studies the molecular mechanism of synaptic vesicle fusion in neurotransmission.

References

External links 
 Biography of Axel T. Brunger
 Profile of Axel T. Brunger
 PNAS Inaugural Profile
 Website of Axel T. Brunger

1956 births
21st-century American physicists
University of Hamburg alumni
Technical University of Munich alumni
German emigrants to the United States
Harvard University staff
Yale Department of Molecular Biophysics & Biochemistry faculty
Living people
Howard Hughes Medical Investigators
Crystallographers
Stanford University School of Medicine faculty
Members of the United States National Academy of Sciences